Keron Henry (born August 20, 1982) is a former professional American football wide receiver.

Early life
Henry attended Brooklyn Technical High School in Brooklyn, New York and was an all-state football player in New York.

College career
Henry chose to attend the University of Connecticut, where he continued his football career. When he suffered a knee injury, he lost his position as quarterback to Dan Orlovsky. To get back onto the field, Henry transitioned to wide receiver, where he had over 1,600 receiving yards. In his final game as a Huskie, Henry hauled in 9 passes during the 2004 Motor City Bowl.

Professional career
After not being drafted during the 2005 NFL Draft, Henry signed with the New Orleans Saints. Henry spent a few weeks on the practice squad for the Saints before being released.

On January 12, 2006, Henry signed on with the San Diego Chargers, where he was assigned to the Berlin Thunder of NFL Europe. He was waived by the Chargers on June 1, 2006.

On July 25, 2006, Henry signed with the New England Patriots.

He played for the New York Dragons during the 2007 and the 2008 seasons.

References

American football fullbacks
African-American players of American football
Living people
1982 births
UConn Huskies football players
New York Dragons players
New Orleans Saints players
San Diego Chargers players
New England Patriots players
Berlin Thunder players
21st-century African-American sportspeople
20th-century African-American people